Steamboat Mountain is a  summit located in the Grand Canyon, in Coconino County of northern Arizona, US. It is situated four miles northwest of Holy Grail Temple, and 2.5 miles west-southwest of Timp Point on the North Rim. George Wharton James described it as a "majestic butte", nearly encircled by Galloway and Saddle Canyons. According to the Köppen climate classification system, Steamboat Mountain is located in a Cold semi-arid climate zone, with precipitation runoff draining west to the Colorado River via Tapeats Creek and Stone Creek. This feature's name was officially adopted in 1932 by the U.S. Board on Geographic Names.

History
In 1858, Lieutenant Joseph Ives led an expedition up the Colorado River, starting at the river's mouth and making it to the lower Grand Canyon. The mode of transportation was a steamboat named Explorer. Steamboat Mountain is located in an area of geographical features that were named after the canyon's early explorers. Steamboat Mountain is set at the northern tip of Powell Plateau, named for John Wesley Powell. Ives Point lies six miles to the southwest at the southwest tip of Powell Plateau. Also on Powell Plateau are Newberry Point, Dutton Point, Wheeler Point, Thompson Point, and Beale Point. These Grand Canyon pioneers are collectively commemorated by Explorers Monument, located immediately south of Powell Plateau.

Geology

Steamboat Mountain is composed of Permian Kaibab Limestone, overlaying a conspicuous band of cream-colored, cliff-forming, Permian Coconino Sandstone. The sandstone, which is the third-youngest of the strata in the Grand Canyon, was deposited 265 million years ago as sand dunes. Below the conspicuous Coconino Sandstone layer is slope-forming, Permian Hermit Formation, which in turn overlays the Pennsylvanian-Permian Supai Group. Further down are strata of Mississippian Redwall Limestone, the Cambrian Tonto Group, and finally Paleoproterozoic Vishnu Basement Rocks at river level in Granite Gorge.

See also
 Explorer (steamboat)
 Steamboats of the Colorado River
 Geology of the Grand Canyon area

Gallery

References

External links 

 Weather forecast: National Weather Service

Grand Canyon
Landforms of Coconino County, Arizona
Mountains of Arizona
Mountains of Coconino County, Arizona
North American 2000 m summits
Colorado Plateau
Grand Canyon National Park
Grand Canyon, North Rim
Grand Canyon, North Rim (west)